Nordic Mist (stylised as Nørdic Mist) is a line of soft drink mixers produced by The Coca-Cola Company and sold in Chile, Guinea-Bissau, Luxembourg, Belgium, Portugal,  Israel and Spain.

History 

Nørdic Mist was introduced to New York City, Boston, Pittsburgh, and Philadelphia in September 1992. It was the result of a team working under Mary Minnick to develop beverages to compete in the growing low-carbohydrate, healthier soft drink market. Nørdic Mist was created more specifically to compete with Clearly Canadian, a brand of sparkling water quickly growing in popularity at the time. At its debut it was available in five flavors - black cherry, raspberry, peach, pineapple, and kiwi-pineapple-guava. Chile saw the arrival of Nørdic Mist in 1997, distributed there by Embotelladora Andina.

Nørdic Mist was introduced to Spain in 2000. In less than three years Coca-Cola enjoyed a 17% share of the tonic water market.

Flavors 
Bitter Lemon
Bitter Water
Fruit Punch
Ginger Ale
Lemon
Orange
Tonic Water
Agrumes

Trivia
Nørdic Mist has achieved almost cult status as the best mixer for gin & tonic with various Facebook pages  and blogs  requesting its export to other countries where it is not currently available.

In German slang, the word "Mist" (literally translated: manure) is used as a mild expletive.  The closest approximation in English could be "crap".

The way Nørdic is written on the logo, with an O with a slash (Ø), pronounces exactly like Nerdic in Norwegian and Danish. This might be the reason why it never was launched in Scandinavian countries.

The mixer was produced by a team headed by Mary Minnick and was nicknamed "Wolf Sweat" by some senior Coke executives.

See also
Clearly Canadian
Mistic
Perrier
Brand blunder

References

External links
Coca-Cola Website 
Distributor of Nørdic Mist in Chile

Coca-Cola brands
Drink mixers
Soft drinks